Oxford Companions is a book series published by Oxford University Press, providing general knowledge within a specific area. The first book published in the series was The Oxford Companion to English Literature (1932), compiled by the retired diplomat Sir Paul Harvey.

The series has included (in alphabetical order):

References

External links
 Booknotes interview with Joel Krieger on The Oxford Companion to Politics of the World, July 4, 1993.

 Oxford companion to politics in India

Book series introduced in 1932
Series of books
Companions
Publications established in 1932